In operator theory, von Neumann's inequality, due to John von Neumann, states that, for a fixed contraction T, the polynomial functional calculus map is itself a contraction.

Formal statement
For a contraction T acting on a Hilbert space and a polynomial p, then the norm of p(T) is bounded by the supremum of |p(z)| for z in the unit disk."

Proof
The inequality can be proved by considering the unitary dilation of T, for which the inequality is obvious.

Generalizations
This inequality is a specific case of Matsaev's conjecture. That is that for any polynomial P and contraction T on 

where S is the right-shift operator.
S.W. Drury has shown in 2011 that the conjecture fails in the general case.

References

Operator theory
Inequalities
John von Neumann